Vivigenz Eickstedt was a German stage and film actor.

Selected filmography
 The Riders of German East Africa (1934)
 The Champion of Pontresina (1934)
 Every Day Isn't Sunday (1935)
 Pygmalion (1935)

References

Bibliography
 Goble, Alan. The Complete Index to Literary Sources in Film. Walter de Gruyter, 1999.

External links

Year of birth unknown
Year of death unknown
German male film actors
German male stage actors